Black Turin is a 1972 crime film directed by  Carlo Lizzani.  The film received mixed reviews, but was commercially successful.

Cast 
 Bud Spencer: Rosario Rao
 Françoise Fabian: Lucia Rao
 Marcel Bozzuffi: Fridda
 Guido Leontini: Trotta
 Vittorio Duse: Camarata
 Nicola Di Bari: Mancuso
 Andrea Balestri: Raffaele Rao
 Domenico Santoro: Mino Rao
 Saro Urzì: Jaco
 Gigi Ballista: Marinotti
 Maria Baxa: Nascarella

Release
Black Turin was released in Italy as Torino nera on 25 September 1972 where it was distributed by MGM. The film grossed a total of 858,820,000 Italian lire domestically. It was released in Paris on 28 November 1973 under the title La vengeance du sicilien.

Notes

References

External links

1972 films
Films directed by Carlo Lizzani
Films set in Turin
French crime films
Films about the Sicilian Mafia
Poliziotteschi films
Films with screenplays by Luciano Vincenzoni
1970s Italian films
1970s French films